Rosenvingiella is a genus of green algae in the family Prasiolaceae.

The genus was circumscribed by Paul Claude Silva in Madroño vol.14 on page 41 in 1957.

The genus name of Rosenvingiella is in honour of Janus Lauritz Andreas Kolderup Rosenvinge, generally cited as Lauritz Kolderup Rosenvinge (1858–1939), who was a Danish botanist and phycologist.

Species
As accepted by WoRMS;
 Rosenvingiella discifera 
 Rosenvingiella polyrhiza 
 Rosenvingiella radicans 
 Rosenvingiella simplex 
 Rosenvingiella tasmanica 

Former species;
 R. australis  accepted as Rosenvingiella tasmanica 
 R. constricta  accepted as Rosenvingiellopsis constricta

References

External links

Trebouxiophyceae genera
Prasiolales